Shamovka is a rural locality (a village) in Klimovsky District, Bryansk Oblast, Russia. The population was 100 as of 2010. There are 3 streets.

Geography 
Shamovka is located 25 km east of Klimovo (the district's administrative centre) by road. Chernookovo and Brakhlov are the nearest rural localities.

References 

Rural localities in Klimovsky District